Hakea cygna, commonly known as the swan hakea, is usually a dense shrub endemic to Western Australia with creamy-white upright flowers appearing from July to August.

Description
The smaller branches are densely covered in flattened silky hairs at flowering time. The leaves are variable, they may be flat and thick, narrowly egg-shaped widest in the middle, more or less needle-shaped or triangular in cross-section. The upper side of the leaves has 1-3 obscure longitudinal veins, the underside veins barely visible. The inflorescence consists of 6-14 creamy-white flowers in racemes, appearing upright and singly in leaf axils. The cream-white pedicels are smooth, rarely with soft short flattened hairs. The fruit is barely  beaked  but  has a short prominent point. Flowers appear either from May to June or August to September.

Taxonomy and naming
Hakea cygna was first formally described by Byron Barnard Lamont in 1987 and published in the Botanical Journal of the Linnean Society. The specific epithet (cygna) is derived from the Latin word cygnus meaning "swan", referring to the shape of the fruit believed to resemble that of a swan.
Two subspecies of  Hakea cygna have been recognised.

Restricted to an area south of Lake King.

Distribution and habitat
Hakea cygna is widely distributed from Geraldton to Ravensthorpe in the south-east and east to Cape Arid. It grows in heath or mallee-heath on gravelly loams, sandy loams, white yellow or grey sand, often over laterite.  

 Subspecies cygna is widespread from Eneabba in the north to the wheatbelt region of Western Australia to Merredin and south to Esperance.
 Subspecies needlei has a restricted distribution with scattered populations just south of Lake King and in the Pallarup Nature Reserve.

Conservation status
Hakea cygna subsp. needlei is classified as "Priority Two" by the Western Australian Government Department of Parks and Wildlife meaning that it is poorly known and from only one or a few locations.

References

Eudicots of Western Australia
cygna
Plants described in 1987